D. lepidus may refer to:
 Dendryphantes lepidus, a jumping spider species in the genus Dendryphantes
 Drassyllus lepidus, a ground spider species in the genus Drassyllus

See also
 Lepidus (disambiguation)